AP-1 complex subunit beta-1 is a protein that in humans is encoded by the AP1B1 gene.

Adaptor protein complex 1 is found at the cytoplasmic face of coated vesicles located at the Golgi complex, where it mediates both the recruitment of clathrin to the membrane and the recognition of sorting signals within the cytosolic tails of transmembrane receptors. This complex is a heterotetramer composed of two large, one medium, and one small adaptin subunit. The protein encoded by this gene serves as one of the large subunits of this complex and is a member of the adaptin protein family. This gene is a candidate meningioma gene. Two transcript variants encoding different isoforms have been found for this gene, and variants utilizing alternative polyadenylation signals exist.

Interactions
AP1B1 has been shown to interact with KIF13A and AP1G1.

References

Further reading

External links